Zárraga may refer to:

 Ángel Zárraga (1886–1946), Mexican painter
 José María Zárraga (1930–2012), Spanish footballer

See also
Zarraga, Iloilo